The Odenbach is a  orographically right bank tributary of the Glan in the counties of Kaiserslautern and Kusel in the German state of Rhineland-Palatinate.

Geography

Course 
It flows – mainly in a north-northwesterly direction – through the municipalities of Schneckenhausen, Schallodenbach and Niederkirchen in the county of Kaiserslautern and through Hefersweiler, Reipoltskirchen, Ginsweiler and Adenbach in the county of Kusel, before emptying into the Glan in the eponymous village of Odenbach after a distance of just under 23 kilometres.

Catchment 

Tributaries 

The following table shows the tributaries of the Odenbach from source to mouth, as listed by the Water Management Authority of Rhineland-Palatinate. The table gives the name, whether it is a left or right tributary, its length, its catchment area,, the location of its confluence, the height of its confluence and its waterbody number.

Transport routes 
The L 201 runs through the Odenbach valley.

Leisure pursuits 
It runs from Otterberg via Niederkirchen to Odenbach

Sights 
The best known sights in the valley are the two water castles:

 Reipoltskirchen Castle, built in the 12th century, lies on a rocky hill spur above the Odenbach. It was the seat of the lords of Hohenfels-Reipoltskirchen and is first recorded in 1276. The site has largely survived and been restored. It is used by the municipality of Reipoltskirchen inter alia as the Standesamt. Its bergfried is used by tourists as an observation tower.

 Odenbach Castle, at the confluence of the river with the Glan, was built in the 2nd half of the 12th century by the counts of Veldenz and blown up in 1683 by troops of the French king, Louis XIV. The ruins include the renovated remains of the bergfried, which is built of impressive rusticated ashlar blocks and, as the Weiherturm, has become the symbol of the village of Odenbach.

See also
List of rivers of Rhineland-Palatinate

References

External links 
 Verlauf des Odenbachs at 
 Der Odenbach mit Teileinzugsgebieten auf dem 

Western Palatinate
Kaiserslautern (district)
Kusel (district)
Rivers of Rhineland-Palatinate
North Palatinate
Rivers of Germany